Mighty Baby (絕世好B) is a 2002 Hong Kong comedy film directed by Chan Hing-ka and Patrick Leung. A sequel to the 2001 film, La Brassiere, the film stars returning cast members Lau Ching-wan, Louis Koo, Carina Lau and Gigi Leung alongside new cast members Cecilia Cheung and Rosamund Kwan

Synopsis
In this sequel to the La Brassiere, Lena (Gigi Leung), Johnny (Lau Ching-wan) and Wayne (Louis Koo) are tasked with developing the "Mighty B" line of baby products. Since the last successful development of the "Mighty Bra", Johnny is now head of the department, he hires a neurotic secretary Sabrina (Rosamund Kwan). Lena and Wayne are planning their wedding, however, Wayne has "Baby-Phobia" which throws a wrench into their task of developing the premier "Mighty B" line of baby products. Lena hires child behavior expert Boey (Cecilia Cheung), to work with Wayne to overcome his phobia but things start to go awry when Wayne starts developing feelings for Boey.

Cast and roles
 Lau Ching-wan as Johnny Hung
 Louis Koo as Wayne Koo
 Gigi Leung as Lena Li
 Rosamund Kwan as Sabrina
 Cecilia Cheung as Boey
 Carina Lau as Samantha (special appearance)
 Chikako Aoyama as Nanako
 Rosemary Vandenbroucke as Eileen
 GC Goo-Bi as Gigi
 Chapman To as Kassey
 Jim Chim as Dr. Raymond Kim
 Tats Lau as Romeo
 Lam Tsz-sin as pickpocket in mall
 Cherrie Ying as Ginger
 Vincent Kok as Dr. Ringo Li
 Wilson Yip as Officer Yip
 Rachel Ngan as Emma
 Kate Yeung as Lin Lin
 Ng Choi-yuk as Yuko
 Ann Ho as Amy
 Yip Chi-ting as Mannie
 Chun Lam as Leo's mother
 Kong Sze-sze as Mrs. Lee
 Marco Lok as Ken
 Jin Hui as Eric
 Priscilla Wong as Lily
 Wong Hoi-chi as Connie
 Leung hoi-ling as Lisa
 Barbara Wong as job applicant in red
 Julie as job applicant in peach
 Karen Yip as receptionist
 Ito Koyo as Lena's secretary
 Takahashi Ayumi as Nanako's secretary
 Touta Tarumi as Chairman
 Kamiyama Norihisa as Chairman's secretary
 Nakayama as Failed Japanese businessman
 Cheung Hoi-yee as Baby Siu-wai's mother
 Winnie Lam as Co. hired mother
 Cheung Ying-yan as Co. hired mother
 Merrick Holmes as Co. hired baby
 Kwok Ho-hei as Co. hired baby
 So Wing-yan as Baby in purple worm
 Yu Kwan-shui as hospital secretary
 Asuka Higuchi as Suki

External links
 IMDb entry
 loveHKfilm entry
 HK cinemagic entry

2002 films
2002 comedy films
Hong Kong comedy films
Hong Kong sequel films
2000s Cantonese-language films
China Star Entertainment Group films
Films set in Hong Kong
Films shot in Hong Kong
2000s Hong Kong films